Ulotrichopus longipalpus is a moth of the family Erebidae. It is found in New Guinea.

References

Moths described in 1915
Ulotrichopus
Moths of New Guinea